Erica Hooker (née Nixon; born 15 December 1953) is a retired Australian athlete who was best known as a long jumper and pentathlete.

She competed for Australia at one Olympic Games and two Commonwealth Games, winning a silver medal at the 1978 Commonwealth Games in Edmonton.

Nixon married Australian 800 metres runner Bill Hooker in the mid 1970s. Their son Steven Hooker has become a highly regarded pole vaulter.

See also
 List of Australian athletics champions (women)

References

External links
 Athletics Australia profile

1953 births
Living people
Australian female long jumpers
Olympic athletes of Australia
Athletes (track and field) at the 1972 Summer Olympics
Commonwealth Games silver medallists for Australia
Athletes (track and field) at the 1974 British Commonwealth Games
Athletes (track and field) at the 1978 Commonwealth Games
Australian pentathletes
Commonwealth Games medallists in athletics
Medallists at the 1978 Commonwealth Games